Sweatworking is business networking while taking physical exercise and so working up a sweat.  This way of working originated in the USA and started to be promoted in London in 2012, where gyms offered facilities and sessions of this kind.

Journalist Lucy Kellaway tried sweatworking with the chairman of Wiggle, Andy Bond, who had experience of similar activity at Asda, playing five-a-side football with Archie Norman.  While there was little opportunity to talk during their spinning session at Fitness First, they agreed that the shared experience of suffering was effective in establishing a bond.

Golf is a traditional sporting activity which is often used for business networking but women have felt especially excluded from this.

References

Physical exercise
Professional networks